Alibhai (1938–1960) was a British Thoroughbred racehorse who was purchased by Hollywood movie mogul Louis B. Mayer for 3,200 guineas and brought to the United States. He was sired by Epsom Derby winner Hyperion who was a six-time leading sire in Great Britain and Ireland. Grandsire Gainsborough was the 1918 English Triple Crown champion. Alibhai's dam Teresina was the daughter of Tracery whose major wins included the 1912 St. Leger Stakes and 1913 Champion Stakes.

Stud record
Injured during training in California, Alibhai never raced but became a very important sire in the United States. He was sent to stand at stud in 1941 at Louis Mayer's California farm and was an immediate success, leading the California sires lists for five straight years. Syndicated for a then world record price of $500,000, in 1947 Alibhai was moved to stand at Spendthrift Farm in Lexington, Kentucky where he died in 1960 at the age of twenty-two.

In all, Alibhai sired 54 stakes winners of which his best were:
 Cover Up (1943) - wins include Hollywood Gold Cup, Sunset Handicap, Bing Crosby Handicap
 On Trust (1944) - multiple stakes winner including the Santa Anita Derby
 Your Host (1947) - wins included the 1949 Del Mar Futurity and 1950 Santa Anita Derby. Successful sire of five-time American Horse of the Year Kelso
 Solidarity (1945) - wins included the Hollywood Gold Cup, San Pasqual Handicap
 Determine (1951) - 1954 Kentucky Derby winner 
 Bardstown (1952) - multiple winner of major stakes including twice in the Widener and Tropical Handicaps.
 Flower Bowl (1952) - won Delaware and Ladies Handicap. Dam of champion two- and three-year-old filly Bowl of Flowers and of Graustark and His Majesty.
 Honey's Alibi (1952) -  won Malibu Sequet Stakes, Santa Catalina Handicap, San Diego Handicap. Damsire of Hall of Fame mare, Dahlia
 Traffic Judge (1952) -  wins include the Woodward Stakes, Ohio Derby, Jerome Handicap, Metropolitan and Suburban Handicaps
 Bornastar (1953) - American Champion Older Female Horse (1958) 
 Mr. Consistency (1958) - wins included Santa Anita Handicap, San Juan Capistrano Handicap, California Derby, Del Mar Handicap

Pedigree

References

1938 racehorse births
1960 racehorse deaths
Racehorses bred in the United Kingdom
Racehorses trained in the United States
Thoroughbred family 6-d
Chefs-de-Race